The Episcopal Palace in Córdoba, Spain, is situated in the historic centre of the city, just opposite the west front of the Mosque–Cathedral of Córdoba.

External links
 

Buildings and structures in Córdoba, Spain
Episcopal palaces of the Catholic Church
Historic centre of Córdoba, Spain
Palaces in Andalusia